Anouchka Grose (born 1970 in Sydney, Australia) is a British-Australian Lacanian psychoanalyst and writer.

Careers
Before training as a psychoanalyst, she studied Fine Art at Goldsmiths' College and was a guitarist and backing vocalist with Terry, Blair & Anouchka (with Terry Hall of The Specials). She played lap steel guitar with Martin Creed's band between 2009 and 2017.

She has written about numerous artists, including Clare Woods, Joanna Piotrowska, Martin Creed and Sophy Rickett, and has worked with the French-British artist Alice Anderson, writing about her work, interviewing her, and composing and performing music for her film, The Night I Became a Doll. Her journalism has been published by The Guardian, and The Independent, and her short stories have appeared in Granta magazine and The Erotic Review.

She is a member of The Centre for Freudian Analysis and Research, where she lectures. She also discusses psychoanalysis and current affairs on the radio, appearing on Moral Maze, Broadcasting House, Woman's Hour and "Beyond Belief", as well as presenting one of Radio 4's Lent Talks in 2017.

Books
The Hair Book, Hutchinson 1990
The Teenage Vegetarian Survival Guide, Red Fox 1992
Ringing For You, Flamingo 1999
Darling Daisy, Flamingo 2000
No More Silly Love Songs, Portobello Books 2010 Published in America under the title Why Do Fools Fall in Love, Tin House 2011
Are You Considering Therapy?, Karnac Books 2011
Jack Webb Suspects his Parents (essay), Dashwood Books 2011
Hysteria Today, (editor) Karnac 2016
From Anxiety to Zoolander: notes on psychoanalysis, Karnac 2018
A Guide to Eco-anxiety: how to protect the planet and your mental health, Watkins 2020

Records
Terry, Blair & Anouchka released two singles before their debut and only album:
 Ultra Modern Nursery Rhymes, Chrysalis Records, 1990

References

External links
Official website

Psychoanalysts
Living people
1970 births
Writers from Sydney
Alumni of Goldsmiths, University of London